Semele is a genus of flowering plants native to the Canary Islands and Madeira. In the APG III classification system, it is placed in the family Asparagaceae, subfamily Nolinoideae (formerly the family Ruscaceae).

Three species are recognized:

Semele androgyna (L.) Kunth - Canary Islands and Madeira
Semele gayae (Webb & Berthel.) Svent. & Kunkel - Gran Canaria
Semele menezesii J.G.Costa - Madeira

References

Asparagaceae genera
Nolinoideae
Flora of Macaronesia